The 2009 Malaysian GP2 Asia Series round was a GP2 Asia Series motor race held on 4 and 5 April 2009 at Sepang International Circuit in Sepang, Malaysia. It was the fifth round of the 2008–09 GP2 Asia Series. The race supported the 2009 Malaysian Grand Prix.

Classification

Qualifying

Feature race

Sprint race 

 Jérôme d'Ambrosio was black flagged and disqualified from the race after a pass on Marco Bonanomi under a yellow flag, the belgian overshot turn 9, almost colliding with a group of marshalls attending to Michael Herck's stranded DPR car.

Standings after the event 

Drivers' Championship standings

Teams' Championship standings

 Note: Only the top five positions are included for both sets of standings.

See also 
 2009 Malaysian Grand Prix

Notes

References

GP2 Asia Series
GP2 Asia